Lapageria is a genus of flowering plants with only one known species, Lapageria rosea, commonly known as Chilean bellflower or copihue (copeewueh, from Mapudungun kopiwe). Lapageria rosea is the national flower of Chile. It grows in forests in the southern part of Chile, being part of the Valdivian temperate rain forests flora.

Description
The leaves are arranged alternately and are evergreen, leathery, lanceolate and feature three to seven prominent parallel veins. The vines twine counterclockwise in the Southern hemisphere and clockwise when grown in the Northern hemisphere (likely due to the apparent motion of the sun).

The flowers have six thick, waxy tepals which are red, spotted with white. They are most frequently produced in late summer and fall, although they may be produced at other times. The fruit is an elongated berry with a tough skin containing numerous small seeds about the size of a tomato seed, which are covered in an edible fleshy arils. In the wild the plant is pollinated by hummingbirds.

Pollination
Pollen is distributed by birds, mostly hummingbirds, and also insects and other animals. The flower form is of the syndrome of specialization for hummingbird pollination. Insect pollinators include: Bombus dahlbomii (native species to southern South America) and Bombus terrestris and Bombus ruderatus (both of which are not native to southern South America, and, instead, invasive).

Historical usage
In the past its fruit was sold in markets, but the plant has now become rare through over-collection and forest clearance.

The roots were once collected and used as a substitute for sarsaparilla. In 1977 the plant was given legal protection in Chile.

Etymology
Lapageria is named for Marie Joséphine Rose Tascher de la Pagerie (1763-1814), also known as Napoleon's Empress Josephine, who was a keen collector of plants for her garden at Château de Malmaison. Rosea means 'flushed rose' or 'flushed pink'.

The name of the fruit in Mapudungun is actually kopiw (derived from kopün, "to be upside down"), which is the etymon of Spanish copihue; the Mapuche call the plant kolkopiw (colcopihue in Spanish, which may also refer to the whole plant). The flower is called kodkülla in the indigenous language.

Botany
Lapageria rosea is related to Philesia magellanica (syn. P. buxifolia), another plant from the Valdivian flora, having similar flowers, but shrubby rather than climbing. ×Philageria veitchii is a hybrid between L. rosea and P. magellanica. It is more similar in appearance to the former.

Cultivation
The plant was introduced to Britain by William Lobb during his plant collecting expedition to the Valdivian temperate rain forests in 1845–1848 and was growing at Kew in 1847.

In cultivation the plant requires a shaded, sheltered position with acid or neutral soil. It has gained the Royal Horticultural Society's Award of Garden Merit.

Cultivars
There are numerous named garden cultivars, mostly developed at one nursery in Chile, with flower colour varying from deep red through pink to pure white (L. rosea 'Albiflora'), and some with variegated flowers.

In the United States, UC Botanical Garden at the University of California at Berkeley has one of the largest collections of the Lapageria genus with around 24 named and unnamed cultivars in its collection. This collection was started by T Harper Goodspeed, botany professor at UCB and alternately curator or director of the gardens from 1919–1957. The University established a relationship with El Vergel Farm, a Methodist mission and agricultural school in Angol, Chile which housed the largest collection of named cultivars and wild lapagerias in the world.

Propagation
To obtain fruit in cultivation it is generally necessary to pollinate by hand if there are not native hummingbirds. Chilean bellflower can be propagated from cuttings, layering and fresh seeds. Some cultivars are self-fruitful, but better pollination is achieved with differing parents. Germination is best with fresh moist seed; dried seeds take special treatment and have a much poorer germination rate. Propagation of cultivars is by cuttings (usually rooted under mist), layering, or division. Seedlings take from three to ten years to flower. Cuttings usually flower more quickly.

Gallery

References

Bibliography

  (Page 9 in the book illustrates clockwise and counterclockwise twining.)
 
 
 
 
  Reproduced at

External links

 Lapageria rosea in Chilebosque
 Lapageria rosea 

Liliales
Monotypic Liliales genera
Endemic flora of Chile
Garden plants of South America
Plants described in 1802
National symbols of Chile
Flora of the Valdivian temperate rainforest